Kostkowice may refer to the following villages in Poland:
 Kostkowice, Cieszyn County in Silesian Voivodeship (south Poland)
 Kostkowice, Zawiercie County in Silesian Voivodeship (south Poland)